Xanthorhoe molata is a moth of the family Geometridae first described by Felder in 1875. It is found in Sri Lanka.

References

Moths of Asia
Moths described in 1875